The 2017 Devon County Council election took place on 4 May 2017 as part of the 2017 local elections in the United Kingdom. All 60 councillors were elected from 58 electoral divisions, which returned either one or two county councillors each by first-past-the-post voting for a four-year term of office.

Boundary changes to the electoral divisions took effect at this election after a review of the county by the Local Government Boundary Commission for England.

Election result by division

Alphington and Cowick

Ashburton and Buckfastleigh

Axminster

Barnstaple North

Barnstaple South

Bickleigh and Wembury

Bideford East

Bideford West and Hartland

Bovey Rural

Braunton Rural

Broadclyst

 Two councillors elected for this division

Chudleigh and Teign Valley

Chulmleigh and Landkey

Combe Martin Rural

Crediton

Creedy Taw and Mid Exe

Cullompton and Bradninch

Dartmouth and Marldon

Dawlish

Duryard and Pennsylvania

Exminster and Haldon

Exmouth

 Two councillors elected for this division

Exmouth and Budleigh Salterton Coastal

Exwick and St. Thomas

Feniton and Honiton

Fremington Rural

Hatherleigh and Chagford

Heavitree and Whipton Barton

Holsworthy Rural

Ilfracombe

Ipplepen and The Kerswells

Ivybridge

Kingsbridge

Kingsteignton and Teign Estuary

Newton Abbot North

Newton Abbot South

Northam

Okehampton Rural

Otter Valley

Pinhoe and Mincinglake

Salcombe

Seaton and Colyton

Sidmouth

South Brent and Yealmpton

South Molton

St. Davids and Haven Banks

St. Sidwells and St. James

Tavistock

Teignmouth

Tiverton East

Tiverton West

Torrington Rural

Totnes and Dartington

Wearside and Topsham

Whimple and Blackdown

Willand and Uffculme

Wonford and St. Loyes

Yelverton Rural

Notes

References

2017
2017 English local elections
2010s in Devon